Deap Vally are an American rock duo, formed in Los Angeles, California in 2011. The group consists of Lindsey Troy (guitar, vocals) and Julie Edwards (drums and vocals). They have released three albums, an EP and a number of singles. Both albums reached the UK Albums Chart.

History
Deap Vally formed in 2011 and is made up of Lindsey Troy and of Julie Edwards originally from San Fernando Valley, California. Edwards was a member of The Pity Party, while Troy was performing in Los Angeles as a solo artist. Edwards met Troy at a crochet class in Silver Lake, Los Angeles.  

In July 2012, they released their first single, "Gonna Make My Own Money", on Ark Recordings, while they made their London debut in the same month. In August 2012, the band signed to Island Records, while they played the Latitude and Leeds and Reading Festival during the summer. Their first single on Island/Communion, "End of the World", debuted as Zane Lowe's Hottest Record In The World on BBC Radio 1 on October 3, 2012, and the band played the BBC Radio Rocks Week with a live concert from London's Maida Vale Studios on October 24. Their debut album was recorded at Infrasound Studio, San Pedro, Los Angeles with Lars Stalfors (The Mars Volta).

In November 2012, they supported the English band The Vaccines on their UK tour. They opened for English rock band Muse in Finland, Germany and the Baltic states.

In April 2013 the duo released the four-track EP "Get Deap" produced by Lars Stalfors. In May 2013, they appeared on BBC2's Later... with Jools Holland. In June 2013, they appeared at the Glastonbury Festival and Bonnaroo Music Festival.

Deap Vally's debut album named Sistrionix was released under Island Records / Communion on June 24, 2013.

In early 2015 they opened for Marilyn Manson during The Hell Not Hallelujah tour. In October 2015 they opened for Peaches during the Rub Tour. In early 2016 they opened for Wolfmother during the Gypsy Caravan tour. In mid 2016 they started opening for the Red Hot Chili Peppers across Europe.

In early 2016, they left their record label with Island. The second album Femejism was released on September 16, 2016, it was produced by Nick Zinner.

In Summer 2017 they opened for Garbage and Blondie as part of the Rage and Rapture tour.

At the end of 2019, Deap Vally announced an album in collaboration with The Flaming Lips under the combined name Deap Lips and released a single, "Home Thru Hell".

In January 2021, the duo announced their Digital Dream EP, which was released on February 26. Their second EP of 2021, American Cockroach, was released on June 18.

Style 
Deap Vally have been described as "a scuzzy White Stripes-meets Led Zeppelin rock and roll duo" who play "hard-riffing blues-rock".

Discography

Albums
Sistrionix (June 24, 2013) on Island
Femejism (September 16, 2016)
Deap Lips (March 13, 2020) on Cooking Vinyl
Marriage (November 19, 2021)

EP 
Get Deap! (2013)
Digital Dream (2021)
American Cockroach (2021)

Singles
"Gonna Make My Own Money" (July 2012) on Ark Recordings
"End of the World" (November 19, 2012) on Island/Communion
"Motherfuckers Got to Go" (February 21, 2020) on Cooking Vinyl

References

External links
 
 Deap Vally interview and performance at Transmissions by Nic Harcourt

All-female bands
Alternative rock groups from California
American blues rock musical groups
American musical duos
Garage rock groups from California
Island Records artists
Musical groups established in 2011
Musical groups from Los Angeles
Rock music duos
Female musical duos
2011 establishments in California